The 1974–75 Michigan State Spartans men's basketball team represented Michigan State University in the 1974–75 NCAA Division I men's basketball season as members of the Big Ten Conference. They played their home games at Jenison Fieldhouse in East Lansing, Michigan and were coached by Gus Ganakas in his sixth year as head coach of the Spartans. MSU finished the season 17–9, 10–8 in Big Ten play to finish in fifth place.

Previous season 
The Spartans finished the 1973–74 season 13–11, 8–6 in Big Ten play to finish in a tie for fourth place.

Player walk-out 
The season stands as one of the ugliest moments in MSU athletics history as 10 players, led by captain Lindsay Hairston, followed by Bob Chapman, Pete Davis, Terry Furlow, Bill Glover, Thomas McGill, Cedric Milton, Lovelle Rivers, Benny White and Edgar Wilson, walked out of a team meeting before their game against Indiana on January 4, 1975.  At the time, it was assumed that the players were objecting to the fact that freshman Jeff Tropf, who was white, was starting over more experienced black players. Later, more complaints came to light including the arena being too cold during practice due to construction and the school's lack of emphasis on basketball. When the players returned an hour before game time, head coach Gus Ganakas suspended the players.

As a result, the team fielded junior varsity players and Tropf for the game against Indiana and were blown out 107–55. The next day, the suspended players aired their grievances with Ganakas, apologized, and were reinstated to the team. Tropf left the school after the season.

Roster and statistics 

Source

Schedule and results 

|-
!colspan=9 style=| Regular season

Awards and honors
 Terry Furlow – All-Big Ten First Team
 Terry Furlow – Big Ten Scoring Champion (20.2 ppg in-conference)
 Lindsay Hairston – All-Big Ten First Team

References 

Michigan State Spartans men's basketball seasons
Michigan State
Michigan State Spartans men's b
Michigan